The Ngolokwangga are an Aboriginal Australian people of the Northern Territory.

Language
The Ngolokwangga spoke Mulluk-Mulluk, one of the Daly languages.

Country
The Ngolokwangga lay inland from the Pongaponga, and held sway over, according to Norman Tindale, an estimated  of territory running along both sides of the Daly River.

People
It has been conjectured that the Yunggor may have been a clan of the Ngolokwangga. According to the 2006 Australian census, the Ngolokwangga numbered 37.

Alternative names
 Ngulukwongga, Ngulugwongga
 Mulukmuluk, Mullukmulluk
 Malak Malak, Mallak-mallak, Malag-Malag, Mullik-mullik, Mollak-mollak, Malack-malack
 Djiramo. (a horde name)
 Valli-valli. (a native toponym for the lower Daly River).

Notes

Citations

Sources

Aboriginal peoples of the Northern Territory